Pseudoproteases are catalytically-deficient pseudoenzyme variants of proteases that are represented across the kingdoms of life.

Examples

See also 

 Protease
 Pseudoenzyme
 Catalytic triad

References 

Molecular biology